Charlie McDonnell (born 1 October 1990) is a British filmmaker, screenwriter, musician, former vlogger, author and Twitch streamer from Bath, Somerset. On 15 June 2011, her YouTube channel charlieissocoollike became the first in the UK to reach one million subscribers.

As a musician, McDonnell was a member of Doctor Who-themed rock band Chameleon Circuit and was also a member of the short-lived project Sons of Admirals until it was disbanded in May 2011. In 2010, McDonnell released a solo album titled This Is Me. She also directed a series of short films from 2013 to 2014, and co-hosted the weekday morning YouTube breakfast show Cereal Time with Capital FM presenter and fellow YouTube vlogger Jimmy Hill from 2015 to 2016. In 2016, she published a book, Fun Science.

After over a decade of regular uploads, McDonnell ended her YouTube career in December 2018 and moved on to screenwriting and television production duties. Her first series, the science fiction drama Don't Look Deeper, was released on the streaming platform Quibi in July 2020.

McDonnell currently creates content on Twitch, where she plays different games while interacting with her chat.

Early life
McDonnell was born and raised in Bath, Somerset to parents Lindsey and Mark. She has two younger siblings: her brother, William, and her sister, Bridie. She was educated at Beechen Cliff School, a local state comprehensive foundation school.

YouTube career
After setting up the YouTube channel, charlieissocoollike on 3 April 2007, McDonnell started posting video blogs (or vlogs) to a small audience. She first came to prominence when her video titled How To Get Featured on YouTube became popular after it was featured on YouTube's UK homepage. Her audience jumped from just under 150 subscribers to over 4,000 in two days.

In January 2008, in celebration of gaining 25,000 subscribers, McDonnell asked for 25 challenge suggestions from subscribers, which sparked her series of Challenge Charlie videos. She completed all of these challenges by March 2013, one of which was suggested by TV presenter Phillip Schofield and his daughter Molly, challenging McDonnell to perform the dance that accompanies the song 'Hoedown Throwdown' from Hannah Montana: The Movie.

In June 2011, McDonnell became the first YouTuber in the United Kingdom to reach 1 million subscribers, and in May 2013, her channel reached 2 million subscribers. Most of McDonnell's videos end with an outro by Stephen Fry.  In 2014, McDonnell's YouTube Channel, charlieissocoollike, was listed on New Media Rockstars Top 100 Channels, ranked at #63.

On 6 March 2019, McDonnell announced on Twitter that she had quit YouTube to focus on screenwriting instead. She currently streams on Twitch.

In January 2023, McDonnell returned to making YouTube videos and made all past videos on her YouTube channel private. She has stated that she may decide to mark them as unlisted rather than private in future. However it is unknown when she will make frequent videos again.

Short films and screenwriting career 
On 8 March 2013, McDonnell announced that she would be making five short films. In a video published on 27 October 2014, she announced her last two films would actually be one film, split into two parts. 

On 27 July 2020, Don't Look Deeper, a 14-episode series co-created by McDonnell and Jeffrey Lieber, premiered on Quibi. McDonnell wrote several episodes of the series.

Music career

Chameleon Circuit

McDonnell was one of the founding members of Chameleon Circuit, a band known for creating music inspired by the British television series Doctor Who. Along with fellow vloggers Alex Day (Nerimon on YouTube), Liam Dryden (Littleradge), and former member Chris Beattie (CowInParachute), Chameleon Circuit released their self-titled debut album on 1 June 2009. In July 2010, their song Count the Shadows also appeared on DFTBA Records, Volume Two, a compilation sampler that was given for free in the grab bags at VidCon 2010. At the beginning of 2011, Chameleon Circuit, in their new line-up following the departure of Beattie and the addition of Ed Blann and Michael Aranda, began work on their second album Still Got Legs. It was released on 12 July 2011.

In 2014, McDonnell and Dryden publicly denounced members Blann and Day, who both suspended their online presence following separate reported incidents of sexual abuse. McDonnell, Dryden and Aranda appeared together at VidCon 2014 for photo signings. In 2017, Aranda wrote in a Reddit AMA that "it's safe to say that Chameleon Circuit is dead for now. I know that the last time Charlie and I spoke about it, [she] didn't feel interested in writing new music in general."

Sons of Admirals
In 2010, McDonnell, along with three other YouTubers, Alex Day, Ed Blann and Tom Milsom ("Hexachordal") formed a new project titled "Sons of Admirals". Sons of Admirals was not a band in the traditional sense; they were all solo artists, but as well as having their solo careers, they came together to form one group. The idea and nominal inspiration for the band came from the Admiral's Men, which was a Shakespearean group of actors that came together to perform, whilst still retaining their individual careers.

Their first single was released via YouTube on 14 June 2010 on McDonnell's channel: the group covered Cat Stevens' song "Here Comes My Baby", featuring all four members on vocals. The track peaked at No. 61 in the UK. In October 2010 the band released an EP including "Here Comes My Baby"; an acoustic version of the same song; a cover of "Believe in Yourself", the theme of children's television show Arthur; the music video of "Here Comes My Baby"; and a behind-the-scenes video. Sons of Admirals disbanded in May 2011, publishing a statement on their website that "the core goal of the group – to get into the charts, and to increase exposure for the group members' individual talents proved to run against too many of our beliefs and approaches to music and promotion".

Solo career

A prominent feature of McDonnell's YouTube channel were the songs which she wrote and performed herself, usually on a ukulele.  The most popular of these is "Duet with Myself." On 1 December 2010, in response to demand, she released her debut album, entitled This Is Me, via DFTBA Records.  The album features several songs from her channel that were remixed for the album, as well as several previously unreleased songs. In December 2016, she teamed up with Project for Awesome to release A Very Gideon Christmas, an exclusive Christmas EP sung from the perspective of and with the imaginary inflections of her cat Gideon.

Music videos
 In The Absence Of Christmas (2008) 
 A Song About Acne (2009)
 Duet with Myself (2009)
 A Song About Love (2010)
 Chemical Love (2010)
 A Song About Monkeys (2010)
 Time to Reply (2012)

Charity and media work
On 30 September 2008, to celebrate her 18th birthday, McDonnell and Alex Day dyed and then shaved their hair off whilst live on BlogTV for a period of seven and a half hours in aid of Cancer Research UK. They managed to raise nearly £5000. The broadcast viewership peaked at 4,500. 

In October 2009, McDonnell was named as one of a number of prominent YouTube users who would be participating in a project called RNLI Shout.  The aim of the project is to raise money to purchase a lifeboat for the Royal National Lifeboat Institution.

In the autumn of 2009, McDonnell featured with three other YouTube users on the BBC Switch documentary series Chartjackers. The programme documented their attempt to achieve a number one single in the UK Singles Chart within 10 weeks, by crowdsourcing resources provided by the online community. McDonnell was cast in the series for her familiarity to young British YouTube viewers. Over the course of Chartjackers, McDonnell solicited lyrics, music, performers and stylists to record the final single and video via a YouTube channel named ChartJackersProject. An unofficial charity single for Children in Need, the completed song was titled "I've Got Nothing" and was sung by vocalists Miranda Chartrand and Adam Nichols. McDonnell edited the single's official music video, which was shown nationwide on British music channels such as 4Music and Viva. "I've Got Nothing" was released exclusively through the iTunes Store at midnight on 9 November 2009 and reached No. 36 on the UK Singles Chart. Sales of the single raised a total of approximately £10,000 for Children in Need.

McDonnell was purportedly approached to be a Housemate on the eighth series, and first revived series, of Celebrity Big Brother but declined the offer.

In October 2013, it was announced that McDonnell was to play the main voice role along with Danny Wallace in Mike Bithell's indie video game Volume. The game was released in 2015 for PS4, PC and Mac and in 2016 for PlayStation Vita.

In 2014, McDonnell worked with the Home Office on their This Is Abuse Campaign, alongside other prominent YouTubers, in order to educate people about the importance of consensual sex. She also made a video regarding consent on her YouTube channel.

Presenting roles 
On 6 June 2010, McDonnell presented the YouTube Audience Award to The Inbetweeners as part of the British Academy of Film and Television Arts Television Awards.

In July 2010 McDonnell was signed up alongside KateModern star Emma Pollard and X Factor contestants Nicola and Fran Gleadall to present a TV show run by Piers Morgan called FirstTV, an offshoot of First News newspaper. On FirstTV McDonnell did a few challenges like trying to break a Guinness world record by typing the alphabet on an iPad keyboard quickest and she got asked to tell a joke. However, after filming four episodes of FirstTV, McDonnell decided to leave the show because she did not enjoy presenting pre-scripted work.

On 4 September 2010, McDonnell and fellow YouTuber Myles Dyer co-presented Stickaid, a 24-hour live web show. Starting from 12:00 noon BST, the two hosted the fifth annual charity event from Middlesex University's Trent Park campus in London. Their goal was to raise £10,000 ($15,900), which they more than doubled. All the proceedings went to UNICEF.

In November 2010, McDonnell was part of a group of YouTube videos called The Science of Attraction where she hosted a few experiments and had her body digitally swapped with somebody else's. She was a co-presenter with Kat Akingbade and Derren Brown. As part of the series, eight videos were produced. In December 2010, McDonnell filmed a series of behind-the-scenes videos for Doctor Who Confidential during the filming of the Doctor Who Christmas special "A Christmas Carol".

Personal life
McDonnell considers herself an atheist.

In March 2014, McDonnell announced on her blog that she had terminated her friendship with frequent collaborator Alex Day, stating that "I just don’t feel able to call Alex a friend of mine anymore", following allegations that Day had sexually manipulated and emotionally abused women, and cheated on past girlfriends.

In October 2022, McDonnell made her first public gender reveal announcement on Instagram. She came out as transgender, using the trans flag in her post and stated that she would now be going by she/they pronouns. 

In January 2023, McDonnell came out as a trans woman on YouTube, and revealed she began feminising hormone therapy in September of 2022.

Notes

References

External links 
 
 

1990 births
Living people
British Internet celebrities
Chartjackers
DFTBA Records creators
English atheists
English expatriates in Canada
English video bloggers
English women film directors
People educated at Beechen Cliff School
People from Bath, Somerset
People from Somerset
YouTube vloggers
English women musicians
Transgender women musicians
LGBT YouTubers
English LGBT musicians